This is a list of submissions to the 76th Academy Awards for Best Foreign Language Film. The Academy of Motion Picture Arts and Sciences has invited the film industries of various countries to submit their best film for the Academy Award for Best Foreign Language Film every year since the award was created in 1956. The award is handed out annually by the Academy to a feature-length motion picture produced outside the United States that contains primarily non-English dialogue. The Foreign Language Film Award Committee oversees the process and reviews all the submitted films.

For the 76th Academy Awards, fifty-six films were submitted to the Academy. Mongolia, Palestine and Sri Lanka submitted a film for the first time. Palestine was excluded from submitting a film the year before, but The Academy made an exception in the interests of inclusiveness. The winner of the Academy Award for Best Foreign Language Film was Canada's The Barbarian Invasions, which was directed by Denys Arcand.

Submissions

Notes

  Vodka Lemon was not originally accepted by the Academy who said that Armenia had not proven that they had creative control over the film. The film was later accepted and screened alongside all the other films.
  The Film Federation of India announced that their selection committee had been unable to find a suitable film to send to the Oscars and so declined to send an entry. This left India out of the race for the first time in over a decade.
  Palestine had tried to submit a film the year before, but was prevented from doing so by the Academy which said that Palestine was not a country and had no recognized Film Board. The Academy subsequently changed its mind saying that although Palestine was not a recognized country, they would make "an exception" in the interests of inclusiveness.

References
General

Specific

76